John P. Gaty (died 1963) was an American Mechanical Engineer, General Manager of the Beech Aviation Company in Wichita Kansas, and alumnus of Cornell University, graduating in 1923 who was best known for his will, which gave 1,300,000 dollars to various conservative causes. I request that in making such distribution my Trustees give special consideration to the purposes which will promote individual liberty and incentive as opposed to socialism and communism.  Under the terms of the will, his trustees were required to meet yearly in Wichita, and were each given 10,000 dollars to contribute from 1967 until 1977.

List of Trustees
Barry Goldwater
John Tower
Strom Thurmond
Clarence Manion
Frank Lausche
George Benson
Edgar Eisenhower
Louis Nichols
William F. Buckley

References

Year of birth missing
1963 deaths
American military personnel of World War I
American philanthropists
American aerospace engineers
Cornell University College of Engineering alumni